Star Wars Launch Bay is an interactive walkthrough attraction based on the Star Wars franchise at Disneyland Park at the Disneyland Resort, Disney's Hollywood Studios at Walt Disney World Resort, and formerly at Shanghai Disneyland Park.

History
The attraction for Disneyland Resort and Disney's Hollywood Studios was announced at D23 Expo 2015 on August 15, 2015 at the Disney Parks Presentation along with Star Wars: Galaxy's Edge has two attractions, Star Wars: Millennium Falcon Smugglers Run and Star Wars: Rise of the Resistance the Season of the Force events at each park, and an updated scene for Star Tours – The Adventures Continue. The attraction opened at each park at the start of their respective Season of the Force events, which was November 16, 2015 for Disneyland and December 1, 2015 at Disney's Hollywood Studios. The Orlando version was temporarily closed on March 13, 2020 (until July 17, 2022) and the building is being used as a "Relaxation Station" to allow guests to safely remove facial coverings while remaining physically distanced. The Shanghai Version opened on June 16, 2016 and closed June 2019 in Tomorrowland Pavilion.

References

External links
 Disneyland Park - Official Site
 Hollywood Studios - Official Site

Disneyland
Disney's Hollywood Studios
Shanghai Disneyland
Walt Disney Parks and Resorts attractions
Attractions based on Star Wars
Amusement park attractions introduced in 2015
Amusement park attractions introduced in 2016
2015 establishments in California
2015 establishments in Florida
2016 establishments in China
2019 disestablishments in China